For the Moment may refer to:
For the Moment (film), a 1993 film
 For the Moment (Barry Harris album), 1985
For the Moment (Renee Rosnes album), 1990
"For the Moment" (song), a song by Every Little Thing
For the Moment, a 2004 album by Wheesung
For the Moment, a 2005 album by David Rovics
For the Moment, a 2012 album by Bob Mintzer